Sex Pot is a 1975 Italian comedy film directed by Giorgio Capitani. Alternative titles for the film in the English language include Poopsie & Co., Gun Moll, Get Rita, Lady of the Evening, Oopsie Poopsie and Poopsie.

Plot
Marcello Mastroianni as Charlie Colletto plays a gangster in Milan with obsession for Sophia Loren as Pupa who is a redhead and reminds him of his childhood crush Rita Hayworth. Still he treats her badly and when he gets in to some trouble, it is her chance to get rid of him once and for all.

Cast
 Sophia Loren as Pupa
 Marcello Mastroianni as Charlie Colletto
 Aldo Maccione as Chopin
 Pierre Brice as Commissaire adjoint Salvatore Lambelli
 Nazzareno Natale as Franco Botta
 Mario Maranzana as Police inspector
 Alvaro Vitali as Taxi Driver
 Leopoldo Mastelloni as Singer in Drag
 Dalila Di Lazzaro as Anna Chino
 Ester Carloni as Ester, aunt of Salvatore 
 Clara Colosimo as doorwoman
 Renzo Marignano as client at the night
 Gianni Bonagura as receptionist of "American Hotel"
 Alvaro Vitali as taxi driver

References

External links

1975 films
1975 comedy films
Italian comedy films
1970s Italian-language films
Films directed by Giorgio Capitani
Films produced by Carlo Ponti
Films scored by Piero Umiliani
Films produced by Zev Braun
1970s Italian films